Gigi De Lana (born Mary Gidget Dela Llana; September 24, 1995) is a Filipino actress, singer, dancer, and model. She rose to fame when she competed on Tawag ng Tanghalan on It's Showtime. She is currently under the management of Rise Artists Studio and Star Magic. De Lana made her film debut in Four Sisters Before the Wedding (2020) as Love Mae.

Early life and education 
De Lana was born on September 24, 1995, in Olongapo City, Zambales. She and her mother moved to Laguna at an early age. She studied at Calamba Doctors' College, and at Colegio de San Juan de Letran.

Career

GMA
De Lana joined the reality talent competition Popstar Kids, finishing as a grand finalist on its 2nd season. De Lana would later appear on several shows, including SOP, where she performed regularly as a member of Sugarpop, a group consisting of prominent Popstar Kids contestants until it disbanded in 2009.

A few years later, she joined Eat Bulaga!'s Ikaw at Echo: Ka-Voice ni Idol, an impression contest for singers. De Lana placed as a grand finalist. She impersonated singer and actress Jennifer Hudson.

Rise Artists Studio 
A few weeks after revealing De Lana would be joining the cast of Four Sisters Before the Wedding, a prequel to the 2013 movie Four Sisters and a Wedding, Rise Artists Studio, an artist management division of Star Magic, announced that it was welcoming De Lana as a new member. On a special edition of 'We Rise Together', on December 2, 2020, De Lana was welcomed by other members of Rise.

In a press conference, De Lana was asked about how she was discovered by Rise. She replied,

When she was asked about using a screen name in place of her real name, she said,

Since joining Rise, De Lana has taken part in some episodes of WRT as a co-host.

Discography

Studio albums

Singles

Official Soundtrack

Filmography

Film

Television/Digital

Awards and nominations

Notes

References 

1996 births
Living people
21st-century Filipino actresses
21st-century Filipino women singers
Filipino female dancers
Filipino female models